Zostel is a network of hostels and homes in India. It has presence in 44 cities in India and Nepal.

History 
Zostel Hospitality Pvt. Ltd was established in August 2013, by seven co-founders Akhil Malik, Dharmveer Singh Chouhan, Paavan Nanda & Tarun Tiwari alumni of Indian Institute of Management Calcutta, Chetan Singh Chauhan and Abhishek Bhutra alumni of Indian Institute of Technology, BHU and Siddharth Janghu alumnus of MDI Gurgaon. Having started the first Zostel in Jodhpur, Rajasthan on 15 August 2013, the founders started off by winning 14 back to back business plan competitions across the world including WIEF, Richard Ivey and Eureka at IIT Bombay.

In 2015, Zostel made its proprietary data public to further develop the Indian backpacker market with the launch of its Entrepreneurship Development Program(EDP) allowing people to open their own hostels under the Zostel Brand as a franchisee.

ZO Rooms
The founders of Zostel further dived into a new project known as ZO Rooms in November 2014, which was a low-budget hotel chain and hotel room aggregator. There were reports that ZO Rooms was acquired by rival OYO Rooms, in an all-stock deal in December 2015, which was later denied by OYO. Towards the end of 2015, ZO Rooms operated more than 750 hotels across 51 cities in India. ZO Rooms had a presence in cities like Delhi, Gurgaon, Noida, Mumbai, Bangalore, Ahmedabad, Jaipur, Goa,
Pune, Jodhpur, Chandigarh.

Locations
Zostel operates 38 hostels in India and 2 hostels in Nepal:

References 
Names Like Zostel:

Hospitality companies of India
2013 establishments in Haryana
Indian companies established in 2013
Companies based in Gurgaon
Hotel chains in India
Privately held companies of India